Pidvolochysk is an urban-type settlement in Ternopil, Ternopil Oblast (province) of western Ukraine. It is situated on the right side of the river Zbruch, opposite Volochysk, Khmenytskyi oblast. Pidvolochysk hosts the administration of the Pidvolochysk settlement hromada, one of the hromadas of Ukraine. Population: 

There are natural monuments - Pidvolochysk Well, as well as Pidvolochysk Nature Reserve, near the settlement.

History
Around 1910, Pidvolochysk, the town - like the rest of the then Austrian Galicia - was part of the Austro-Hungarian Empire. 
Before World War II, a majority of the inhabitants were Jewish.

In July 1941, Germans created a labor camp for the Jews. In 1942 part of the prisoners were transported to Zbaraż and Kamionka. In October 1942, the transport was sent to Bełżec extermination camp. The final annihilation, of those who were left, took place during the liquidation of the camp on 29 June 1943.

The Podwolocyska Organization was headed by Bernard Lerner (died 1988), later headed by Borekh Goldshteyn.) who published an account of WWII era 

Until 18 July 2020, Pidvolochysk was the administrative center of Pidvolochysk Raion. The raion was abolished in July 2020 as part of the administrative reform of Ukraine, which reduced the number of raions of Ternopil Oblast to three. The area of Pidvolochysk Raion was merged into Ternopil Raion.

It was also the birthplace (1910) of fringe Israel Scheib (later Eldad), radical nationalist Israeli politician and a leader of the anti-British Lehi underground organization.

People
 Efim Alexandrov, a Yiddish singer of Russia
 Israel Eldad, Jewish philosopher and member of the pre-state underground group Lehi
 Hermann Kesten, writer
 Walter Krivitsky, a defected Chekist
 Ignace Reiss, a defected Chekist
 Lidia Winniczuk, a Polish philologist and historian, a member of the Warsaw Scientific Society and a professor of the Warsaw University
 Pawlo Humeniuk, a Ukrainian American fiddler

Gallery

References

Urban-type settlements in Ternopil Raion
Populated places established in the 1460s
Kingdom of Galicia and Lodomeria
Tarnopol Voivodeship
Holocaust locations in Ukraine
Zbruch
Former border crossings
Austrian Empire–Russian Empire border